The Pub Design Awards (PDA) are an annual awards, established in 1983 and hosted by CAMRA in association with English Heritage and the Victorian Society, that are given to exceptional pubs in the UK that have been newly built/converted or have recently undergone building/conservation work.

Categories
The awards cover 4 Categories:
New Build (For newly constructed pubs)
Conversion of existing buildings to pub use (For use of a building that had not previously been a pub)
Refurbishment of existing public houses (For recently refurbished pubs. The final interior must suit the era of the building and enhance the 'feel' of the pub)
The English Heritage Award for conservation (For pubs that have retained much of their original design and/or decor, and have recently had conservation work to improve the overall condition of the interior.)

There is also a fifth award which is given independently of the above categories and cannot be entered directly; the Joe Goodwin Conservation Award, sometimes known as  'Joe Goodwin Award for best 'Street-Corner Local' . This is chosen from all entries, not just winners of other categories.

Any pub can only enter one category, entries may be from anywhere in the British Isles. Anyone can enter a pub for the awards.

Entry
Photographs and a typed description(Max. 2 A4 sheets) of the interior and exterior and what work was completed are required for entry, as are drawings of the interior plan and location map of the pub.

To qualify, the work must have been finished between 1 January and 31 December of the year before, e.g. For 2007, the work on the pub must have been completed sometime in 2006.

Judging
Judging takes place initially by shortlisting, after which the selection will be visited, the panel comprises members of the CAMRA Pubs Group along with conservation experts and architects outside CAMRA.

Not every award is given every year (depending on the entries), but there are often mentions for highly commended pubs, and some years there are joint winners when there are a number of exceptional pubs in particular categories.

The winners receive a plaque which can be displayed publicly in the pub, permanently.

Winners
Where the entry reads None Awarded, this means no award was given in that category for that year, even though there may be 'Highly Commended' pubs in that category(which are not listed here). None listed, this means there was no information about that particular award. Sources: CAMRA website - PDA winners list; What's Brewing (Newspaper of CAMRA), Issue: April 2007, Article: Better pubs by design..

See also
 National Pub of the Year
 Heritage pub
 List of public house topics

References

Pub Awards Page - CAMRA
Halifax & Calderdale CAMRA - PDA Info
Awards Entry Form (PDF)
What's Brewing (Newspaper of CAMRA), April 2007, Article: Better pubs by design.

Architecture awards
Design awards
British awards
Pubs in the United Kingdom
Interior design
Hospitality industry awards
Hospitality industry in the United Kingdom
Annual events in the United Kingdom
1983 establishments in the United Kingdom
Awards established in 1983